Soumpou is a commune in the Cercle of Yélimané in the Kayes Region of south-western Mali. The administrative centre (chef-lieu) is the village of Takaba. In 2009 the commune had a population of 5,017.

References

External links
.

Communes of Kayes Region